Pierre Berthelot, OCD (known in religion as Denis of the Nativity, or Dionysius; 12 December 1600, in Honfleur – 27 November 1638, in Sumatra) was a French sailor and cartographer in the service of the king of Portugal, and later Discalced Carmelite friar in Goa, taking the name Denis. He was killed in Sumatra while taking part in a diplomatic mission there on behalf of the Portuguese Empire. He was beatified by Pope Leo XIII in 1900.

Life
Berthelot was born in Honfleur, in the Calvados Department of Normandy, the second son of Pierre Berthelot, a ship's captain and master surgeon, and Fleurie (née Morin). His contemporaries described him as "a handsome, stocky man, blond and fair-skinned, an adventuresome and high-spirited person, with an inquisitive and active mind".

The younger Berthelot's first sea voyage was at the age of twelve, and when he was 19 years old, he embarked on a vessel called L'Espérance, bound for the Far East. The ship was captured by a Dutch vessel in competition for the spice trade. It was at this time that Berthelot made a religious conversion. He managed to escape and sought refuge with the Portuguese in Malacca.

In service with the Portuguese, Berthelot was knighted for bravery and earned an appointment as pilot-in-chief and cosmographer to the king of Portugal. He gained some fame as a cartographer, and his map of the archipelago of Sumatra is still preserved in the British Museum. Though a career with the Portuguese navy was available to him, he chose to join the Discalced Carmelite Order in Goa in 1635, taking the name of Denis of the Nativity.

He was ordained on 24 August 1638, and straightaway was sent by his superiors on a diplomatic mission to the Sultan of Aceh, accompanying Francisco de Sousa de Castro, an ambassador of the Viceroy in Goa. Castro had requested his presence, both for spiritual guidance for the group as well as for Father Denis' piloting skills and his knowledge of the region from his service aboard the L'Espérance.

Once in Aceh, all the members of the mission were seized and arrested, at the instigation of the Dutch authorities in Jakarta. The members of the mission were then tortured. Refusing to deny their faith, they were martyred one by one. Father Denis and his companion, Brother Redemptus of the Cross, were led to a desolate spot on the seashore, where Redemptus was shot with arrows, then his throat was slit Father Denis, a crucifix in his hands, received a fatal blow to the head from a scimitar.

Of the sixty-some members of the diplomatic mission, only Castro, the ambassador, survived. He was held captive for three years, until his family paid a large ransom for his life.

Veneration
Denis of the Nativity was beatified on 10 June 1900 by Pope Leo XIII, together with his companion, Redemptus of the Cross. Their feast day in the Calendar of Saints of the Order is celebrated on the 29 November.

Prayer
{{poemquote|text=

O God, Who in Thy wondrous providence, led the blesseds Denis and Redemptus through the perils of the sea to the palm of martyrdom, grant through their intercession that in the midst of earthly vicissitudes and worldly desires we may remain steadfast even unto death in the confession of Thy name. Through Christ our Lord. Amen.|source=Collect of Mass for November 29 (Feast of Denis of the Nativity and Redemptus of the Cross), according to the Missal of the Discalced Carmelites (1925)}}

See also
 Martyrdom of Saint Denis of the Nativity'' (painting)

References

Bibliography

External links
Blessed Denis of the Nativity at the Patron Saints Index
Blessed Denis and Redemptus, Martyrs from the Discalced Carmelites in Nigeria
Denis and Redemptus on Carmelnet

1600 births
1638 deaths
17th-century cartographers
17th-century French Roman Catholic priests
17th-century Roman Catholic martyrs
17th-century venerated Christians
French beatified people
French cartographers
French navigators
French sailors
French Roman Catholic missionaries
Portuguese beatified people
Portuguese Roman Catholic saints
Carmelite beatified people
Discalced Carmelites
Roman Catholic missionaries in Indonesia
French expatriates in Indonesia
People from Honfleur
Venerated Catholics
Beatifications by Pope Leo XIII